Yami Qaghan, Jama Qaghan, Jamï Qaghan, Yama Qaghan or Yiamy Qaghan may refer to:
 Bumin Qaghan, founder of the First Turkic Khaganate
 Yami Qaghan, first qaghan of the independent Eastern Turkic Khaganate